The 2011–12 season was the 123rd season of competitive football by Celtic. They finished top of the Scottish Premier League on 93 points.

Background

In the 2010–11 season Celtic finished second in the league having gained 92 points, one less than Rangers. They also lost to their Old Firm rivals in the 2011 League Cup Final, as Rangers won 2–1 after extra time. Celtic's only trophy came after they beat Motherwell 3–0 in the 2011 Scottish Cup Final. Celtic were knocked out of both European competitions at the first stage.  Europa League final runners-up Braga knocked Celtic out of the Champions League third round after a 4–2 aggregate victory. Utrecht knocked Celtic out of the Europa League play-off round by the same score.

Review

June 
Several former youth academy players left during the month of June. The most notable being Paul McGowan who went to fellow Scottish Premier League side St Mirren after his contract expired. Ryan Conroy was released by the club and joined Scottish First Division side Dundee. Sean Fitzharris also went to the First Division as he joined Morton

July 
On 1 July, Celtic confirmed the signings of Adam Matthews from Cardiff City, Kelvin Wilson from Nottingham Forest and Dylan McGeouch from Rangers. All three had already signed on pre-contract agreements and joined Celtic after their contracts expired. Three players also left the club after the expiry of their contracts. Former Germany and Sweden internationals Andreas Hinkel and Freddie Ljungberg left along with Ben Hutchinson.

Celtic's pre-season started off with a three-match tour of Australia. The first match was on 2 July and Celtic lost 1–0 against Central Coast Mariners.

On 7 July Niall McGinn joined English League One side Brentford on a season-long loan. The next day Graham Carey signed for St Mirren after Celtic agreed to cancel his contract.

On 9 July Celtic played the second match of their Australian tour and beat Perth Glory 2–0. On the same day Celtic officially signed Victor Wanyama from Belgian Pro League club K. Beerschot AC on a four-year deal. He had signed for Celtic nine days earlier but had to wait to get a work permit.

On 13 July Celtic won the final match of their Australian tour as they beat Melbourne Victory 1–0.

Celtic's last friendly before the start of the league campaign was a 1–0 away win over Championship side Cardiff.

Due to the fact that the 2011–12 Scottish Premier League started several weeks earlier than usual, Celtic's first competitive match came on 24 July. Goals from Ki Sung-yueng and Anthony Stokes secured victory over Hibernian, although Gary Hooper also missed a penalty in the match played at Easter Road. Two days later Efraín Juárez moved to La Liga side Real Zaragoza on loan.

Celtic's next game was another friendly against Premier League team Wolverhampton Wanderers which they lost 2–0.

Celtic then finished second in the 2011 Dublin Super Cup after losing 2–0 to Inter Milan on 30 July and beating a League of Ireland XI 5–0, the next day. The other team competing was Manchester City who won the competition.

August 
On 3 August, Celtic lost 2–0 against English Premier League side Swansea City at the Liberty Stadium. The next day Darren O'Dea signed for English Championship side Leeds United on a season long loan. Celtic were then drawn against Swiss Cup winners FC Sion in the play-off round of the Europa League. On 7 August Celtic resumed their SPL campaign with a 1–0 win over Aberdeen, Anthony Stokes scored the winner. However, the match was overshadowed by Emilio Izaguirre suffering a broken ankle which was expected to keep him out till the new year. Josh Thompson then went to Championship side Peterborough on loan.

On 17 August, Fraser Forster joined on a loan deal from Newcastle United, having spent the previous season as first choice goalkeeper at Celtic.

On 21 August, Celtic suffered their first home defeat to St Johnstone since 1998 when Dave Mackay scored to give the away side a 1–0 victory.

Richie Towell went to Hibs for a second loan spell. Daryl Murphy went on loan to Ipswich Town.

Greig Spence went on loan to First Division club Hamilton.

Mohamed Bangura also joined the club in a £2.2 million deal from AIK Stockholm.

Badr El Kaddouri joined on a six-month loan from Dynamo Kyiv.
Jos Hooiveld went to Southampton on a six-month loan. Shaun Maloney moved to English Premier League side Wigan Athletic for £1 million.

September 
Sion won 3–1 on aggregate, however were found guilty of fielding ineligible players by UEFA and were excluded from the competition. As a result of this Celtic were awarded both matches as 3–0 wins and took Sion's place in the group stage along with Atlético Madrid, Udinese and Stade Rennais.

On 5 September, Morten Rasmussen joined Turkish Süper Lig side Sivasspor, on a short-term loan, until December.

Celtic drew Ross County in the third round of the League Cup and beat the home side 2–0 at Victoria Park. Celtic were then drawn to play Hibs in the quarter final.

October
On 2 October, Celtic lost 2–0 to Hearts at Tynecastle with winger Kris Commons getting sent off. This defeat left Celtic in third place, 10 points behind leaders Rangers. In the following match, Celtic drew 3–3 with Kilmarnock at Rugby Park. Kilmarnock had been leading 3–0 at half-time but two goals from Anthony Stokes and a Charlie Mulgrew header brought Celtic back into it. Following the Kilmarnock game, Celtic travelled to France to play Rennes in UEFA Europa League action. Rennes led 1–0 at half-time after a mix-up between Cha Du-ri and Fraser Forster, but Joe Ledley scored in the second half with a header to secure a draw. The Bhoys returned to Scottish Premier League action defeating Aberdeen 2–1 at Celtic Park on 23 October 2011. Hibernian were the opponents for the final two games of October. Celtic won 4–1 in the Scottish League Cup before the Edinburgh team secured a 0–0 draw in the Scottish Premier League tie at Celtic Park on 29 October 2011.

November 
Stade Rennais were Celtic's first opponents of November in the Europa League. Celtic won the match 3-1 thanks to an Anthony Stokes double and a third from Gary Hooper. On 5 November 2011, Celtic were third in the Scottish Premier League behind leaders Rangers, who were 15 points clear of their rivals, and Motherwell. Celtic then won four Scottish Premier League ties in November, defeating Motherwell 2–1, Inverness Caledonian Thistle 2–0, Dunfermline 2-1 and St Mirren 5–0. November ended poorly for Celtic after Atlético Madrid won 1–0 in a UEFA Europa League tie at Celtic Park, thanks to a goal from Arda Turan in the second half. However, the excellent league form during November ensured Celtic won a clean-sweep of monthly awards with Neil Lennon winning SPL Manager of the Month, Gary Hooper winning SPL Player of the Month and James Forrest winning SPL Young Player of the Month.

December 
Celtic continued their excellent league form throughout December, winning all five of their Scottish Premier League games. A solitary goal from Gary Hooper in the first half was enough to defeat Dundee Utd whilst a Victor Wanyama strike from 25 yards saw off the challenge of Hearts at Celtic Park the following week. Celtic travelled to Italy to face Udinese in the UEFA Europa League and claimed a 1–1 draw, a result which meant they would exit the tournament at the group stages. Gary Hooper added to his seasonal goal tally in a 2–0 win over St Johnstone at McDiarmid Park. Georgios Samaras scored both in a 2–1 home win versus Kilmarnock. Celtic's last league game of 2011 was a home game against arch-rivals Rangers. Joe Ledley scored the only goal of the game as Celtic won 1–0. The result meant that Celtic had overturned a 15-point deficit in the Scottish Premier League and moved top of the league, two points clear of Rangers in the title race.

Competitions

Pre-season and friendlies

Scottish Premier League

Europa League 

*Celtic were awarded the match after Sion had fielded ineligible players and were disqualified from the Europa League by UEFA.

Scottish League Cup

Scottish Cup

Player statistics

Squad
Last updated 8 May 2012 

Key:
 = Appearances,
 = Goals,
 = Yellow card,
 = Red card

Goalscorers

Team statistics

League table

Technical staff

Celtic personnel awards

Transfers

Players in 

Total spend: £3.1 million

Players out 

Total sales: £2,65 million

See also
 List of Celtic F.C. seasons
Nine in a row

References

External links

Celtic F.C. seasons
C
Scottish football championship-winning seasons
Celtic